The East India Company Act 1793, also known as the Charter Act 1793, was an Act of the Parliament of Great Britain
which renewed the charter issued to the British East India Company (EIC).

Provisions
In contrast with legislation concerning British India proposed in the preceding two decades, the 1793 Act "passed with minimal trouble".  The Act made only fairly minimal changes to either the system of government in India or British oversight of the company's activities.  Most importantly, the company's trade monopoly was continued for a further 20 years.  Salaries for the staff and paid members of the Board of Control were also now charged to the company.  Other provisions of the Act included:
 The Governor-General was granted extensive powers over the subordinate presidencies of Madras and Bombay.
 The Governor-General's power of over-ruling his council was affirmed.
 Royal approval was mandated for the appointment of the Governor-General, the governors, and the Commander-in-Chief.
This Act continued the company's rule over the British territories in India.
It continued the company's trade monopoly in India for another 20 years.
The Act established that “acquisition of sovereignty by the subjects of the Crown is on behalf of the Crown and not in its own *right,” which clearly stated that the company's political functions were on behalf of the British government.
The company's dividends were allowed to be raised to 10%.
The Governor-General was given more powers.
When the Governor-General was present in Madras or Bombay, he would supersede in authority over the governors of Madras and Bombay.
In the Governor-General's absence from Bengal, he could appoint a vice president from among the civilian members of his Council.
The composition of the Board of Control changed. It was to have a President and two junior members, who were not necessarily members of the Privy Council.
The salaries of the staff and the Board of Control were also now charged to the company.
After all expenses, the company had to pay the British government 5 Lakh British Pounds from the Indian revenue annually.
Senior company officials were barred from leaving India without permission. If they did so, it would be considered as a resignation.
The company was granted the authority to grant licenses to individuals and company employees to carry on trade in India (known as the "privilege" or "country" trade), which paved the way for shipments of opium to China.

Next charter act 
The company's charter was next renewed by the Charter Act 1813.

See also
East India Company Act

References

Great Britain Acts of Parliament 1793
1793 in India
Legislation in British India
British East India Company